France  has been participating at the  Deaflympics since 1924 and  has earned a total of 268 medals.

Medal tallies

Summer Deaflympics

Winter Deaflympics

See also
France at the Paralympics
France at the Olympics

References

External links
Deaflympics official website
2017 Deaflympics

Nations at the Deaflympics
Parasports in France
Deaf culture in France
France at multi-sport events